This page lists examples of the acceleration occurring in various situations. They are grouped by orders of magnitude.

See also
G-force
Gravitational acceleration
Mechanical shock
Standard gravity
International System of Units (SI)
SI prefix

References

Acceleration